Who Moved My Dream is a 2014 Chinese comedy drama romance film directed by Wang Wei and Jackson Pat. It was released on December 11 in China.

Cast
Leon Jay Williams
Zhang Lanxin
Hu Bing
He Bin
Kingdom Yuen
Law Kar-ying
Mark Cheng
Viona Wang Xi-Yao
Sabrina Qiu
Zhang Yujie
Cai Heng

Box office
By December 12, 2014, the film had earned ¥0.72 million at the Chinese box office.

References

2014 romantic comedy-drama films
Chinese romantic comedy-drama films
2014 comedy films
2014 drama films